Fertility fraud is the failure on the part of a fertility doctor to obtain consent from a patient before inseminating her with his own sperm. This normally occurs in the context of people using assisted reproductive technology (ART) to address fertility issues.

The term is also used in cases where donor eggs are used without consent and more broadly, in instances where doctors and other medical professionals exploit opportunities that arise when people use assisted reproductive technology to address fertility issues. This may give rise to a number of different types of fraud involving insurance, unnecessary procedures, theft of eggs, and other issues related to fertility treatment.

Types 
The main sense of fertility fraud is non-consensual insemination of a patient by her doctor, but there are other types as well.

Egg theft 

The first "test tube baby" was facilitated by Robert Edwards in 1978, and he allegedly used eggs without the consent of the women involved.

One of the earliest cases involving egg theft occurred in 1987 in Garden Grove, California, in a clinic run by doctor Ricardo Asch, and his partners doctors Sergio Stone and Jose Balmaceda. Asch took eggs from women undergoing diagnostic procedures and used them in fertility procedures in other women. 
Asch and his two partners were accused of taking eggs and embryos from patients without their consent, using them to cause pregnancies in other women, and defrauding insurance companies. The eggs of at least 20 women were used, and at least fifteen live births resulted. Thirty-five patients filed legal actions against Asch. An estimated 67 women were victims of egg or embryo theft. Asch and Balmaceda left the country and avoided trial. Stone faced trial in the case and was sentenced to three years probation for mail fraud. He was fined $50,000 by the judge in the case, required to repay more than $14,000 in restitution to insurance companies, and had to wear an electronic monitoring device.

In the "Egg Affair" in Israel in 2000, police investigated two doctors who were accused of intentionally creating extra eggs in patients needing fertility procedures, and then without their patients' knowledge harvesting and selling the eggs to other fertility patients.

In Italy in 2016, famed Italian gynecologist Severino Antinori, known as the "grandmothers' obstetrician" because of his reputation for helping women over 60 to bear children, was arrested on suspicion of stealing eggs by removing them from a patient's ovaries without her consent under the guise of performing a procedure on her to remove an ovarian cyst. Antinori had recently hired a Spanish nurse at his clinic, and then diagnosed her with an ovarian cyst for the sole purpose of harvesting her eggs without her knowledge. Antinori was arrested at a Rome airport, charged with aggravated robbery and causing personal injury, and placed under house arrest.

Insemination fraud 

There have been numerous cases of a healthcare provider fraudulently substituting their own sperm for donor sperm, resulting in pregnancy and birth.

 Quincy Fortier, a fertility specialist in Las Vegas, Nevada, in the early 1960s, impregnated female patients with his own sperm leading to 26 children during his 40-year practice. He died in 2006 at age of 94 and the story was uncovered only in 2018 when a woman used a home DNA test to celebrate her retirement. The HBO documentary Baby God aired in 2020 was based on the story of Fortier and his decades-long fertility fraud scheme.

 Cecil Jacobson, a fertility doctor in the 1980s in Virginia, was originally found to be the biological father of at least seven of his patients' children, including one patient who was supposed to have been inseminated with sperm provided by her husband. DNA tests have since linked Jacobson to at least 15 such children, and it has been suspected that he fathered as many as 75 children by impregnating patients with his own sperm. He could not be prosecuted because no law existed in Virginia prohibiting it.

 In 2018, a woman in Washington State filed suit in U.S. District Court in Idaho against Gerald Mortimer, who was her mother's fertility doctor when her parents resided in Idaho Falls. After having difficulty becoming pregnant, her mother sought help from Mortimer and eventually became pregnant in 1980. The connection to Mortimer was hidden for 37 years until it was finally revealed when the now adult daughter used a DNA kit which returned the connection to Mortimer as her biological father, who had used his own sperm rather than an anonymous donor as agreed.

 Donald Cline used his own sperm in his fertility practice in Indianapolis between 1974 and 1987 to covertly father at least 94 offspring. This came to light in 2014, when home DNA test kits were proliferating, and led to the discovery of Cline having used his own sperm to fertilize his patients' eggs. Because there was no law concerning the practice in Indiana, he was charged with obstruction of justice, false advertising, and immoral conduct, and lost his license to practice medicine. Cline pleaded guilty to two Level 6 felony counts of obstruction of justice and received a one-year suspended sentence. The first law in the United States came into effect in 2019 in the state of Indiana as a result of this case. As of May 2022, Cline has paid over $1.35 million to settle three lawsuits, with three more pending. Similar cases were found in other states.

 John Boyd Coates III, a Vermont fertility doctor, has had two lawsuits filed against him and has been charged with using his own sperm in cases going back 40 years. His license has since been revoked and a $5.25 million judgment in damages was awarded to the first plaintiff.

 Jos Beek, a gynecologist in the Netherlands, conceived 21 children and potentially dozens more using his own sperm after prospective parents turned to him for fertility treatment, an investigation has discovered. He worked at Elisabeth hospital in Leiderdorp, now part of Alrijne hospital, between 1973 and 1998. He died in 2019.

 In September 2020, a San Diego woman sued Dr. Phillip M. Milgram for having used his own sperm to inseminate her three decades earlier, instead of anonymous donor sperm. The deception was discovered when her adult son found that Milgram was his biological father after using a home DNA test kit from 23andMe.

 In November 2020, a northern California woman sued her former fertility doctor Michael Kiken for having falsely inseminated her with his own sperm forty years prior. She bore two children, but only learned in 2019 from a DNA test kit that her daughter had received as a gift showed that her former fertility doctor is her children's biological father. In addition, her children may have inherited a genetic disease passed on by Kiken.

 Jan Karbaat, a fertility doctor in the Netherlands, fathered 90 confirmed children and may have as many as 200 children. He died in 2017.

 In 2021, Norman Barwin, an Ottawa fertility doctor, paid out a settlement of $13.375 million to his seventeen children conceived in his clinic in Canada in the 1980s. A total of 244 former patients and their children, including the seventeen conceived using his own sperm, are among the claimants.

 In April 2022, a Colorado jury awarded $8.75 million to the families of a dozen women who became pregnant while being treated for infertility using artificial insemination techniques by doctor Paul Brennan Jones of Grand Junction who used his own sperm while the women were his patients in the 1980s. The jury found Jones liable for negligence, fraud, and other claims.

Other 
There are many other types of fertility fraud, and they may take place at various stages of the process: 
 Competing for patients via misleading information about success rates, either in advertising or during personal interviews
 Performing an assisted reproductive technology procedure not covered by insurance, and then billing for a different procedure
 Performing unnecessary or futile procedures on patients who are misinformed or poorly informed
 False claims of pregnancy, followed by assertions of fetal death
 Misuse of sperm, eggs, and embryos, in particular, a health care person substituting their own sperm for donor sperm
 Inadequate screening of donors
 Embezzlement from sperm banks, theft of human eggs ("egg-snatching") or embryos, or use of eggs without consent

Legal status 
Hundreds of children have been fathered by non-consensual insemination worldwide by their physicians, including in the United States, Canada, and the Netherlands, but without specific laws outlawing it, the legal consequences are unclear. Sometimes other laws related to fertility fraud are used against the physician, such as mail, travel, or wire fraud, while others face civil suits. Some physicians have faced ethics charges by the governing bodies of their profession and lost their license to practice medicine.

United States 
In the United States, medical students in the 1960s and 1970s donated sperm, and later while trying to develop their practice as a physician, may have gone on to use their own sperm in order to establish a track record of success. There were no laws on the books at the time prohibiting such activity.

Activists have pushed for legislation that would make fertility fraud a crime, and as of February 2022, seven U.S. states have passed laws, and seven others were considering it.

Scope 
In the United States, over fifty fertility doctors have been accused of fraud in connection with donating sperm according to a February 2022 news report.

Media adaptations 
In 2020, Somethin' Else and Sony Music Entertainment released a podcast telling the story of Jan Karbaat and his children called "The Immaculate Deception".

In 2020, HBO released the documentary Baby God chronicling the life of Quincy Fortier. 

In 2021, The Dutch three-part miniseries Seeds of Deceit tells the story of Dutch fertility doctor Jan Karbaat, who inseminated his patients with his own sperm.

In 2022, Netflix released the documentary Our Father by Jason Blum in the true crime genre about the Donald Cline case in the 1970s and 1980s, to mixed reviews.

See also 

 Bertold Wiesner
 Diethylstilbestrol
 Egg donation
 Human cloning
 Human fertilization
 In vitro fertilization
 Infertility
 Intracytoplasmic sperm injection
 Medical ethics
 Religious response to ART
 Sperm bank
 Sperm donation
 Sperm theft
 Stealthing

References

Works cited

Further reading

External links 
 Centers for Disease Control and Prevention (CDC), Assisted Reproductive Technology

Assisted reproductive technology
Applied genetics
Biotechnology
Bioethics
Deception
Fertility
Fertility medicine
Fraud
Genetic engineering
Human reproduction
Medical crime
Medical ethics
Obstetrical procedures
Reproductive rights